Mehmet Ülkü (1877 – 2 July 1946) was a Turkish businessman and politician, who was one of the early industrialists of the Turkish Republic.

References 

1877 births
1946 deaths
Place of death missing
People from Bandırma
Turkish industrialists
Republican People's Party (Turkey) politicians